DNA (originally broadcast as DoNovAn) is a British television crime drama, broadcast on ITV, starring Tom Conti and Samantha Bond as the main protagonists, Joe and Kate Donovan. Two series were produced – the first of which is a two-part story – and the second which features three, unrelated, entirely different cases. The initial series follows the work of Donovan, a retired police forensic pathologist, whose life is turned upside down after being called to a crime scene, only to find his own name scrawled on the wall in blood by the victim. In the second series, Donovan comes out of retirement to head up the FIU (Forensics Investigation Unit).

The first series was released on DVD in the UK on 18 May 2009. Despite the blurb, this only contains the two-part first series, not all five episodes as stated. A complete box set containing both series was previously released in the US on 13 May 2008.

Cast
 Tom Conti as Joe Donovan
 Samantha Bond as Kate Donovan
 Ryan Cartwright as Seth Donovan
 Malcolm Scates as Michael Kinsley (Series 1)
 Indira Varma as Cara Mathis (Series 1)
 Amelia Bullmore as Evie Strauss (Series 2)
 Dan Fredenburgh as Nick Pushko (Series 2)
 Katie Blake as Myrna Rovic (Series 2)

Episode list

Series 1 (2004)

Series 2 (2005–2006)
The final episode of the series was due to be shown on 24 July 2005 but was postponed because the storyline contained elements involving terrorism, which was deemed to be insensitive following two terrorist attacks in London just weeks previously.

References

External links

2000s British drama television series
2004 British television series debuts
2006 British television series endings
British crime television series
ITV television dramas
Television shows produced by Granada Television
Television series by ITV Studios
English-language television shows
Television shows set in Manchester